Elissa E. Murphy is an American software engineer, and the Vice President of Engineering at Google. Before working at Google, she was the Chief Technology Officer and Executive Vice President of Platforms at GoDaddy. She previously worked at Yahoo! as the Vice President of Engineering.

Career 
Murphy began her career in Product Development at Fifth Generation Systems and Symantec. After a year as a director at Quarterdeck in 1996, she started at Microsoft in 1997 where she worked for thirteen years. She worked in various engineering management roles on products such as Windows Live. Murphy moved to Silicon Valley in November 2010, joining Yahoo! as the Vice President of Engineering in Hadoop and Cloud Services. Murphy was also the Executive Sponsor of the Women in Technology Network at Yahoo!.

She left Yahoo! in April 2013 to join her former colleague Blake Irving at GoDaddy, where he had recently been appointed Chief Executive Officer. Murphy served as GoDaddy's Chief Technology Officer and Executive Vice President of Platforms until May 2016. During her tenure at GoDaddy, she launched the GoDaddy Women in Technology Network with the goal of fostering a diverse culture. In July 2016, Murphy joined Google as the Vice President of Engineering.

She was a board member at Inphi Corporation from 2015 to 2021 until the successful acquisition of Inphi by Marvell Semiconductor. She was appointed to the GlobalFoundries board in September 2021. 

In 2018, she was named one of the "most powerful female engineers" in the United States by Business Insider.

Elissa has several patents issued in the areas of distributed systems, cloud infrastructure, machine learning, and security.

References 

Year of birth missing (living people)
Living people
American women engineers
Gen Digital people
Microsoft employees
Yahoo! employees
Google employees
21st-century women engineers
21st-century American women